Dylan Nel (born 27 November 1992 in South Africa) is a South African rugby union player who plays for the  in Super Rugby. His playing position is flanker. He has signed for the Chiefs squad in 2020.

References

External links
itsrugby.co.uk profile

1992 births
South African rugby union players
Living people
Rugby union flankers
New Zealand rugby union players
Rugby union number eights
West Coast rugby union players
Canterbury rugby union players
Otago rugby union players
Chiefs (rugby union) players
Mitsubishi Sagamihara DynaBoars players
Rugby union players from Durban